The State Intelligence Service, commonly known by its acronym SHISH, is the primary intelligence agency of Albania. It was preceded by SHIK.

After the Declaration of Independence
As it is stated literally in article 6 of the decree of the government of Ismail Qemali: "To organize a secret service for occupied areas (vendet e shkeluna) of Albania". These entries belong to the Fund No. 145 of the Central State Archive and belong to the Provisional Presidency of Vlora, year 1912, file II-2 "Decisions and Minutes of the Provisional Government of Vlora on the Political, Military and Financial Issues". The creation of the Albanian Secret Service was not left only on paper, but for its organization were taken concrete actions, among which contacting Lef Nosi and Bajram Curri. There are data on the functioning of this Service even after the arrival of Prince Wilhelm Wied as ruler of Albania, established by the "London Peace Conference" in 1913.

During the reign of Prince Wid 
We see the continuity of the Albanian Secret Service again after the First World War and the departure of Prince Wied from Albania. The Statute of Lushnja, drafted at the Lushnja National Congress on January 21, 1920, re-sanctioned the separation of powers, legislature, executive and judiciary, and among others created the Ministry of the Interior, part of which was the Secret Service. Ahmet Zogu was appointed Minister of Internal Affairs.

After World War II 
After the Second World War, the Albanian state in the period December 1944 - March 1945 paid special attention to the establishment of State Security Organs.

Communist period 
The State Security dates back to July 20, 1943, when the General National Liberation Council decided to establish the State Security Organ. In its ranks were placed the most trusted individuals of the communist regime. The State Security was a structure included in the Ministry of Internal Affairs.

Post-communist period
After 1990, in the context of qualitative changes that occurred within the establishment of political pluralism in Albania, the State Security Organs were completely reformed to adapt to the requirements of the rule of law.

Structure transformation and renaming 
Thus, in 1991, the 'National Intelligence Service' was created, with law no. 7495, dated 02.07.1991 "On the organization of the National Intelligence Service". The primary task of this Service was to prevent, detect and terminate any unconstitutional activity that violates the freedom, independence, defensive capacity, territorial integrity and national wealth of the Republic of Albania. The SHIK was established as a depoliticized institution and as such it has undergone constant changes from time to time.

Name after 1999 
In 1999 with decision no. 61, dated 22.11.1999 of the Constitutional Court of the Republic of Albania, SHIK changes the name from the National Intelligence Service to the State Intelligence Service. In 2005 the law no. 9357, dated 17.03.2005 "On the status of the employee of the State Intelligence Service". In carrying out its duties, the State Intelligence Service maintains fair relations between the need to provide the necessary information and the observance of the rights and freedoms of the individual. Legitimacy, objectivity and secrecy are the basic working principles of this institution.

The National Informative Service was created by the Albanian parliament in 1991. The agency had been used to manage internal dissent and protect the interests of the individual members of the regime.

On April 1, 1997, Bashkim Fino prime minister of Albania announced that SHIK activity would be suspended effectively from March 31. SHIK Director Bashkim Gazidede and his deputy, Bujar Rama, resigned from duty. On May 30, the president named Arben Karkini as the new head of SHIK. He was succeeded by Fatos Klosi after the Socialist Party of Albania won the July 1997 parliamentary elections. In October 1997, the Central Intelligence Agency sent a team of experts to assist the government in restructuring the SHIK.
In November 1999, SHIK was renamed SHISH. The previous director was Visho Ajazi.

Mission and function 
SHISH responsibilities include acquiring foreign intelligence and counterintelligence on issues relevant to national security. The agency is responsible for the comprehensive collection, processing and analysis of intelligence, and for the dissemination and utilization of intelligence products. Its responsibilities also extend to issues related to constitutional order and specifically encompass a role in fighting organized crime, illegal trafficking, and terrorism.

The State Intelligence Service has the following duties:
 collect information from abroad for the purpose of national security;
 undertake intelligence activities for the purpose of the protection of integrity, independence and constitutional order;
 collect information regarding terrorist activity, the production and trafficking of narcotics, the production of weapons of mass destruction and crimes against the environment;
 collect information regarding organized crime that endangers national security.

Organization 
SHISH personnel are well trained and are assigned to five branches:
 Technical Operations branch,
 Foreign Intelligence branch,
 Counter-Espionage branch,
 Counter-Organized Crime branch,
 Counter-Terrorism branch.

Relationship with other state entities 
Institutional position of the State Intelligence Service and relationship with other state bodies:

The State Intelligence Service falls under the authority of the Prime Minister. Its Head is appointed and dismissed by the President of the Republic on the advice of the Prime Minister.

SHISH operates within this context and while it has been identified as being "generally under effective civilian control" (U.S. Department of State, 2004) the agency has still been associated with various abuses within the country and continues to play a significant role in domestic politics. The Albanian government has received support from the U.S. and European countries in working to establish or reform national institutions, including its intelligence and security services.

Leaks 
They obtained a massive amount of data shared by SHISH to unclassified government institutions, who published payments of the SHISH to the internet. In the leaks, the SHISH disclosed the existence of at least eight senior clandestine Albanian operatives, disclosing their names, positions, salaries and expenses working in Belgium, Greece, Kosovo, Italy, Macedonia and Serbia.

The files also included other senior, mid-level and field operatives. The journalists also obtained a large number of vehicle registration and locations of safehouses. The SHISH took the data down and downplayed its significance, although they admitted sensitive information was leaked. They refuted claims that NATO standards where breached with the leaks.

Activities by country

Albania
The Minister of Defense of Albania, Mimi Kodheli, has announced that some terrorist attacks have been prevented by the Intelligence Service. Kodheli did not provide more details, but Top Channel has learned that it is about preventing terrorist acts during Football match with Israel. The meeting of the CIA Director John Brennan with the Minister of Defense Mimi Kodheli in the first week of December in Tirana, was not just a courtesy visit, but an assessment of the position, position and services that the Armed Forces and in particular The Albanian Military Intelligence Service has provided for allied countries.

North Macedonia
During the 2001 insurgency in Macedonia, the SHISH and CIA armed the NLA with arms and tanks, although the Albanian president denied any involvement in the Macedonian war.

Directors

See also 
 Sigurimi
 SHIK

References 

Government agencies of Albania
Albanian intelligence agencies
Government agencies established in 1997
Albanian Civil War